Rockton is a village in Winnebago County, Illinois. It is located in the Rock River Valley and is part of the Rockford metropolitan area. The population was 7,685 at the time of the 2010 census, up from 5,296 at the time of the 2000 census.

Geography
Rockton is located at  (42.450753, -89.063844).

History 
Native American tribes originally inhabited the region. Stephen Mack, Jr. was the first white settler in the Rockton area. He was married to Hononegah, a respected Native American woman from one of the surrounding tribes. His original outpost (c. 1830s) eventually became Macktown. William Talcott arrived to the area later and, after a disagreement with Mack, settled on the other side of the nearby river within the present village of Rockton. Citizens who lived in Macktown would frequently travel across the river to Rockton but in 1851, the bridge from Macktown to Rockton washed away. The bridge had been built with funding from Stephen Mack and its destruction, along with Mack's death in 1850, led citizens to permanently move to Rockton. In northern Illinois, Macktown is the only community from the 1830s that is still standing without subsequent development.
 
On June 14, 2021, a large explosion and subsequent fire affected the Chemtool Lubrication production plant in Rockton. There were no serious injuries, but an area within a one mile radius from the fire was evacuated. The massive smoke plume from the fire was reported to be visible up to 75 miles away from Rockton.

Demographics

As of the census of 2010, there were 7,685 people, 1,930 households, and 1,464 families residing in the village. The racial makeup of the village was 91.80% White, 1.40% African American, 0.1% Native American, 1.10% Asian, 0.04% Pacific Islander, 0.45% from other races, and 0.45% from two or more races. Hispanic or Latino of any race were 3.60% of the population.

There were 1,930 households, out of which 42.3% had children under the age of 18 living with them, 65.2% were married couples living together, 8.4% had a female householder with no husband present, and 24.1% were non-families. 20.6% of all households were made up of individuals, and 8.5% had someone living alone who was 65 years of age or older. The average household size was 2.72 and the average family size was 3.18.

In the village, the population was spread out, with 31.1% under the age of 18, 6.2% from 18 to 24, 31.4% from 25 to 44, 21.5% from 45 to 64, and 9.8% who were 65 years of age or older. The median age was 35 years. For every 100 females, there were 97.6 males. For every 100 females age 18 and over, there were 93.0 males.

The median income for a household in the village was $57,292, and the median income for a family was $62,863. Males had a median income of $47,321 versus $32,771 for females. The per capita income for the village was $24,078. About 1.4% of families and 1.3% of the population were below the poverty line, including 1.3% of those under age 18 and none of those age 65 or over.

Notable people
Scott Hall, jazz trumpeter, educator, and composer
Julie Harshbarger, professional football kicker

References

External links 

 Rockton Online

Villages in Winnebago County, Illinois
Villages in Illinois
Rockford metropolitan area, Illinois
Populated places established in the 1830s